Company BBC "Kaisi Yeh Yaariaan" (How Is This Friendship) is an Indian television series that aired on MTV India from 21 July 2014 to 31 December 2015. A third season premiered on Voot on 15 May 2018 and a fourth season premiered on 2 December 2022. The show's core lies in highlighting the importance of friendship along with other relationships, be it romance or family relations.

Plot

Background 
The show is split into four seasons; the first is how love becomes important over friendship in Manik's life through Nandini changing his life. The second season is more of an epilogue of the first, on how each person's life starts to change and evolve.

Nandini decides to move to Mumbai for the treatment of her younger brother, Rishabh and for her to study in a reputed science college. She believes her fireflies only light up when there is true love. She accidentally collides with Manik Malhotra, and unknown to Manik, he saves her jar filled with fireflies, and they light up when they both touch the jar at the same time. It is then believed that there is true love between Manik and Nandini though they are both unaware of this and thus begin their story.

Season 1
Nandini Murthy and her friend Navya Naveli team up to save Shahid, who was bullied by FAB5, at S.P.A.C.E Academy from committing suicide. To protect the college's reputation, Nyonika Malhotra (Manik's mother and the Head of S.P.A.C.E)  offers Nandini and Navya a full scholarship. This leads to Nandini and Navya becoming the targets of the academy's most famous band "FAB5", a group of rich spoiled kids – Manik Malhotra, the leader, Cabir, Mukti, Dhruv and Alya.

Nandini becomes their primary target for Manik after she punches him in front of the college for misbehaviour. Due to unfortunate circumstances, Nandini ends up being Manik's spot. He continues troubling her until his girlfriend Alya intervenes and asks him to leave Nandini alone as she feels he is becoming too involved with her. Alya's insecurity about Manik and Nandini causes her to hire goons to teach Nandini a lesson; however, Dhruv and Manik manage to save her. When Manik discovers that Alya hired the goons, he breaks up with her due to her mistrust.

Manik and Nandini's petty fights and constant bickerings bring them closer, and they become attracted to each other. Manik realises that no one affects him the way Nandini does, so he is always drawn to her. Initially, he fights the attraction but eventually gives in. Nandini begins to understand Manik a little more after he begins to open up to her, and she realises that he is not the "Monster Manik" she deemed him to be and becomes aware of her growing attraction towards him, previously misunderstanding the racing of her heart around Manik to be hatred for him.

The night before the college talent show, Musicana, Manik confesses to Nandini how he feels, and they kiss. On the same night, Manik discovers that his best friend Dhruv also has feelings for Nandini, mistaking their friendship for something more. Manik decides to sacrifice his love for his best friend. Dhruv had saved his life when they were younger, he always felt Dhruv was better than him, thus a better suitor for Nandini. On the night of Musicana, Manik, with a heavy heart, lies to Nandini by humiliating her and telling her it was all just a game for him, and he has wanted to take his revenge on her ever since she punched him. Manik effectively ends his relationship with Nandini.

Meanwhile, Nandini's best friend, Navya, falls for Harshad, Alya's brother and Mukti's former lover, who spends most of his time plotting against FAB5. After FAB5 wins Musicana, Harshad plays a video in front of the entire school, which shows an intimate moment between Cabir and his teacher Raghav which leads to everyone finding out about the pair's homosexuality. As Nandini realises that Harshad is not the person she and Navya thought him to be, she teams up with FAB5 and cooks up a plan to make Navya realise Harshad's true colours. Dhruv tells Nandini he is in love with her; however, she rejects his proposal and tells him that she only sees him as a friend, which angers Manik.

After beating up Cabir on the day of Musicana, Harshad comes back home. Thinking that Harshad must be sad, Navya goes to his house to console him. Harshad sleeps with Navya, and she gets pregnant, but he doesn't take responsibility for his actions. Hurt and betrayed, Navya vows to Harshad that she would change her persona and become stronger. Cabir allows Navya to become his roommate, and the two start growing close. When Navya's mother gets hysterical about Navya handling a baby alone, Cabir promises to give the baby his name and raise it like his own.

Amid FAB5's plan to expose Harshad, Nandini begins to doubt Manik's reasons for breaking up with her as his behaviour starts contradicting his words. She confronts him, and in a moment of weakness, he admits that he would never have broken up with her if it was not for Dhruv. This angers Nandini, and she accuses Manik of being selfish for not considering her feelings and tells him that she wants nothing more to do with him whilst he apologises and begs for her forgiveness after realising what he did her was wrong.

Nandini, along with FAB5, succeeds in their plan to oust Harshad. They trap him into confessing his wrongdoings on camera and are later arrested for attacking Cabir and Raghav on the night of Musicana. At a celebration for ousting Harshad, FAB5 and Nandini play a game that allows Manik to confirm that Dhruv has moved on from Nandini. The love triangle soon ends as Alya and Dhruv start to get closer when Nandini tells Dhruv that she only sees him as a friend and always will. While Nandini is unwilling to forgive Manik because she feels he will always choose his friends over her, Manik goes to extreme lengths to prove himself.

When Soha Khurana enters as the obsessed fan of Manik, Nandini becomes close to Manik again, as she couldn't stand the thought of anyone else being with him. They decide to be friends and get to know one another. Soon they become more than friends, and on their first date, the fireflies light up, indicating to Nandini that Manik is indeed her true love. Due to a misunderstanding led by Soha's father, Nandini believes that Manik will be better off without her and will focus on his dreams of becoming a singer. Soha's obsession with Manik reaches a dangerous level, and she attempts to kill Nandini in a fire, but Manik saves her. However, when Nandini finds out that Soha has died in the fire (a ploy set up by Nyonika and Soha's father), and that too perhaps because of Manik, she remains silent in court when she is asked if Manik had anything to do with Soha's death. A shocked Manik stops talking to her. Although it is proved that Manik is innocent, and despite Nandini's efforts to get back with him, he makes her suffer, as he felt Nandini didn't trust him enough and felt she betrayed him. However, realising that he can't let her go, he sets a hope vs hate challenge between them, and if Nandini manages to sing with him on the night of the Fusion Concert, there is a chance of them getting back together again.

Meanwhile, Mukti falls for Abhimanyu, who is a cancer patient, as he teaches her to smile at all times and be happy. After his departure, she suffers greatly, but her friends support her. On the other hand, Dhruv and Alya's relationship crumbles due to Dhruv's inferiority complex. This leads to Dhruv leaving FAB5. Manik clashes with Nandini's teacher, Pandit Trilok Chaurasya (Dishank Arora), for the Fusion Concert. Manik believes that Pandit has the wrong intentions for Nandini but she brushes them off, thinking Manik is jealous and overreacting.

On the day of the Fusion concert, Manik and Nandini sing together, and all misunderstandings between Dhruv and FAB5 are cleared, and Dhruv attempts to mend his broken friendship with the group. After the concert, Manik tells Nandini he loves her. Their happiness is short-lived when the Pandit kidnaps Nandini. Although she is saved, she suffers from the great shock and pushes everyone, including Manik, away. Nandini decides to take a break and goes to Mangalore with her brother, but Manik goes after her. With the help of Nandini's grandmother, Ams, Manik succeeds in bringing Nandini out of her shock a day before her 18th birthday. On her birthday, Nandini tells Manik that she loves him, and they become an official couple.

Meanwhile, Aryaman enters the scene (brother of Soha and friend of Harshad). His initial motive is to seek revenge for his sister's death, believing it is all Manik's fault. While others only suspect him, Nandini finds out the truth and asks for a chance to prove Manik's innocence. On the other hand, Alya begins to suffer from an eating disorder and depression due to her failed relationships and loneliness. On Friendship's Day, she announces that she wants to leave FAB5 and begin a new life which angers Dhruv, who blames Manik, claiming that he is their overshadower. While Alya and Dhruv claim that Manik has always been absent from their lives, Mukti and Cabir take the initiative of getting FAB5 back together.

During the Talent Hunt competition at S.P.A.C.E, FAB5 sing together and manage to mend their broken friendship. On the other hand, Aryaman's misunderstanding is cleared, apologising to FAB5, Navya, and Nandini. After FAB5 win the Talent Hunt, Manik and Nandini consummate their relationship. Aryaman decides to throw a dinner party and invites FAB5, Nandini, and Navya. While Nandini waits at home for Manik and Cabir to pick her up and the rest of FAB5 wait for them to arrive at the party, Manik and Cabir face a car accident (plotted by Nyonika, Manik's mother, which was intended for Nandini). This marks the end of Kaisi Yeh Yaariaan Season 1.

Season 2

(Shows life Six months after the car blast) 

It starts with Nandini excited about Manik's birthday, and when they are throwing a party, Cabir and Manik are not there when Nandini throws a party. Nandini misses Manik a lot. Aryaman always supports her when she's sad. Navya becomes an RJ and takes care of her and Harshad's newborn baby Abeer with Mukti trying to move on in life. Alya and Dhruv move on in life on different paths but are just friends. A spoilt brat with the voice of Manik enters the plot, i.e., Madhyam Singhania (Maddy). Nandini hates him, and he hates Nandini and stands for election against Nandini and Harshad. Soon after that, Nandini starts digging up the truth behind Manik's disappearance and eventually, the fact comes out of Nyonika is involved. Nandini is always worried about Manik, misses him badly and wants to know what has happened. Her heart knows he is alive and well somewhere.

Manik then comes back and reveals that his father saved him and that he had been in Pune all this while. He is hurt because of a misunderstanding that his friends and Nandini have moved on and created a new FAB5. But Nandini convinces Manik and clears his misunderstanding. She also tells him about Nyonika's involvement in the blast. Manik tells FAB5 that he couldn't save Cabir and is distraught when he remembers him when he plays the drums in his memory. Nandini, Dhruv, Mukti and Alya console him on that. Then Nandini, Navya and FAB4 reunite, and they go to a hotel for celebrating. On the other hand, Maddy is thrown out of his house, but Arayaman helps him take him to his place. Aryaman arrives at the party, but Manik doesn't like it. Aryaman soon starts feeling out of place and used by FAB5, and Harshad continues to play dirty tricks on each of them, trying to break them apart.

Manik then steals Nandini away from the rest of them, and the two spend the night together after being happily drunk under the stars. Nandini feels finally content in her lover's arms, and Manik lovingly handles her, smiling. MaNan, written by the stars and celebrated by the fireflies, finally are happy. Manik wants to complete Nandini's bucket list, so we see a series of exciting things MaNan does, from stealing beer bottles to playing with water bottles. Maddy and Manik have a hard corner for each other and become rivals & Manik challenges him to perform the song created by FAB5, for which Maddy dared to sign the contract but...soon by hook or crook FAB5; perform together winning over Maddy. Meanwhile, Dhruv is insecure about Alya, and Manik advises him to be alone for some time, which ends up in Dhruv breaking up with Alya saying that she is happier with Varun (Alya's boss in fashion design) than him. He says goodbye to Manik and Alya separately and leaves to start a new chapter in his life. Manik breaks down and is diagnosed with post-traumatic stress disorder (PTSD).

Manik discovers that he is having Nandini's memories erased from his as a response to PTSD, much to Nandini's sadness after finding out the truth. Nandini, Aryaman and Navya qualify for Musicana. But Nandini decides to go with Manik to Denmark for his treatment. Manik accepts Aryaman as Nandini's friend. The show ends with Manik and Nandini reaffirming their love for one another and will be together Humesha (Forever) with Mukti/Alya /Manik jamming together for one last time and asking Aryaman to come and sit on the drums, joining them. While playing, Manik remembers their beautiful memories with Fab5 and his love, Nandini. Navya and Nandini are standing aside and smiling on seeing them together. They make a beautiful tempo with the band and after that celebrate New Year all coming into a group hug and raising their glasses together, standing together as friends forever, with MaNan in the centre.

Manan leaves for Denmark the next day to start the next chapter of their lives, leaving behind beautiful memories and cherishing each other forever. Navya considers a gay couple to adopt her son and continues as an RJ. Mukti leaves to join an international music house to solo, and Alya takes a contract for fashion design. Harshad is made President at S.P.A.C.E. after Maddy leaves the city. Finally, Aryaman wishes Nandini well with Manik. Manik realises that although friendship is essential, love stays with you forever and promises to cherish Nandini forever. This marks the end of Kaisi Yeh Yaariaan Season 2.

Season 3
Nandini and Manik have been together for six years now. They have moved back to Mumbai. However, Rishabh is still at a university in Denmark. Manik is a Rockstar, and Nandini is an astrophysicist in a prestigious government organisation. Mukti runs a cafe, and she is to be married to Zubin. Zubin is a cuddler, but people know him to be unemployed. In the first episode, Nandini proposes marriage to Manik, who refuses to accept her proposal. This angers Nandini, and by the advice of Mukti, she decides that she needs a break from their relationship and wants to date other people. Mukti believes that if Manik sees Nandini with other guys, they will reconcile due to his jealousy. Things get out of hand when Inaya, Manik's co-star who constantly flirts with him, kisses him in front of the media. Finally, when Manik moves out of Nandini's house, she asks him to get back together. Manik refuses to say that she was right and that they aren't good for each other anymore. Despite breaking up, Manik and Nandini can't seem to stay away from each other and still love.

Nandini meets Smaran, who she gets to know in one of her failed dating attempts. After a romantic night together, Manik discloses the real reason he doesn't want to be with Nandini anymore. Nyonika, his mom, has him convinced that he will mess up at some point and hurt Nandini. He doesn't want Nandini to be damaged and lose faith in love like Nyonika. Nyonika was also a middle-class girl madly in love with Manik's dad, who abruptly left her with no explanation. Manik thinks that he isn't suitable for Nandini and that she deserves better. Smaran, demotivated by knowing Nandini's relationship with Manik, asks for Inaya's help to impress Nandini. But they end up sleeping together. It is later revealed that Smaran is a guy from the matrimony site chosen for Nandini by her uncle and aunt. Zubin's sister Jeff has a crush on Mukti. In an attempt to break Mukti's marriage, she reveals to Mukti that Zubin is an escort and not a cuddler. He lied to Mukti because of his fear of losing her. Nandini talks about Manik's state of mind to Manik's father and says that he had destroyed Manik's life by abandoning him when he needed him the most. Soon, Mr Malhotra and Nyonika seem to have patched up, making Manik feel that things can be alright between him and Nandini.

Mukti calls off her wedding, and Zubin goes missing. Nandini and Manik search for him and land up at a lady's house who mistook them for her children. They get closer to each other and realise they can't live without each other. Later, to get back to Zubin, They all hatch a plan and announce in the media that Mukti's getting married, anticipating that hearing this Zubin's going to return. Meanwhile, Nyonika spills the beans on her growing closeness with Mr Malhotra and tells Nandini that it's all her plan and she's getting paid for this feigning. Nandini is shattered and reveals this to Manik, who confronts his parents and realises he can be his person without the influence of his family on him. On the day of Mukti's wedding, Manik proposes to Nandini, which she doesn't accept. But still, they decide to stay together forever and love each other without any expectations.

Season 4 
(Starts after two years)

Story revolves around the individual lives of Nandini Murthy and Manik Malhotra post-breakup. Nandini has become a classical singer trainer and a dancer in Mangalore whereas, Manik has gone into hermit mode and resides in a van in the wild jungle of Kasauli.

One day, Manik's fangirl watches him play his guitar and releases the video which becomes a wildfire on social media. Nyonika, comes to visit him in the jungle and informs him about acquiring the Malhotra Industries. Unable to tolerate Nyonika's evil business move, Manik decides to return to normality and takes charge of his father's company anew, opening a singing & creative academy called S.P.A.C.E. in Goa. Rishabh applies to S.P.A.C.E. academy but gets rejected by Manik. Rishabh urges Nandini to talk to Manik and she gives in and visits Manik in Goa after 6 months of their separation. Manik realises that Nandini sees him as a monster now and hyperventilates.

Now, begins another chapter of Nandini & Manik (MaNan) as he asks her to be his girlfriend again to beat Nyonika. The story revolves around Nandini accepting his proposal so Rishabh gets an entry into S.P.A.C.E. while their forever (hamesha) kind of love experiences a magical transformation that neither of them anticipated.It is shown that 1 year ago Nandini was pregnant with Manik's child .After 2 months Doctor asked Manik to terminate Nandini's pregnancy due to internal bleeding in her womb.She is heartbroken after that.However Manik tries to cheer up Nandini and ensures that everything is back on track.Nandini thinks Manik is a heartless 'monster' as he shows no signs of sadness and remorse and breaks up with him. Manik then reveals that he did it because he saw her sacrificing her dreams for the baby and being traumatized after the abortion.He never wanted Nandini to be depressed and hid his anger,guilt and sufferings and gave her emotional support.They get emotional and reconcile.

Cast

Main
Parth Samthaan as Manik Malhotra, member of FAB5, Shrikant & Nyonika's son, Cabir's bestfriend and Nandini's boyfriend
Niti Taylor as Nandini Murthy Malhotra, former member of NH3, Rishabh's elder sister and Manik's girlfriend
 Ayaz Ahmed as Cabir Dhawan, member of FAB5; Raghav's ex-boyfriend; Navya's roommate; Abeer's adoptive father
 Veebha Anand as Navya Naveli, former member of NH3; Harshad's ex-girlfriend; Cabir's roommate; Abeer's mother
 Utkarsh Gupta as Dhruv Vedant, member of FAB5 and Manik's best friend, was in love with Nandini; Alya's on-againn/ off-again boyfriend 
 Krissann Barretto as Alya Saxena, member of FAB5, Harshad's sister and Manik's ex-girlfriend ; Dhruv's on again/ off again girlfriend
 Charlie Chauhan as Mukti Vardhan, member of FAB5; Harshad's ex-girlfriend; Abhimanyu's former love interest (till his death); Zubin's fiancé and later wife.
 Abhishek Malik as Harshad Saxena, former leader of NH3 and Alya's brother; Mukti's ex-boyfriend; Navya's ex-boyfriend; Abeer's biological father
 Kishwer Merchant as Nari, Manik's mother and head of S.P.A.C.E. Academy
 Karan Jotwani as Aaryamaan Khurana;Soha's brother, friend of Nandini,who is in love with her. Nandini doesn't know about his feelings. 
 Steve as Rishabh Murthy, Nandini's younger brother 
 Mehul Nissar as Venkatesh Murthy, Nandini's uncle
 Ritu Vasishta as Shannoo Murthy, Nandini's aunt

Recurring
 Dishank Arora as Pandit TrilokChaurasiaa, Nandini's tutor who is obsessed with her
 Rushad Rana as Professor Raghav, a teacher at S.P.A.C.E. Academy and Cabir's former lover
 Zain Imam as Abhimanyu Thakkar; Mukti's love interest; Nandini's friend
 Jasmine Avasia as Soha Khurana; Aryamaan's sister and obsessive fan of Manik
 Ruma Sharma as Riddhima
 Kabeer Khan as Rocky
Yuvraj Thakur as Madhyam 'Maddy' Singhania
 Dhiraj Totlani as Sunny Sharma
 Pulkit Bangia as Shahid: a member of NH3.
 Scarlett Rose as Rose: Cabir's pretend girlfriend.
 Aakash Talwar as Varun
 Rinku Karmarkar as Cabir's mother
 Neha Bam as Navya's mother
 Mallika Nayak as Mukti's mother
 Micky Makhija as Avinash Khurana;father of Aryamaan and Soha
 Pranay Pachauri Singh as Zubin; Mukti's fiancé later husband.
 Barkha Singh as Jeffrina alias Jeff: Zubin's sister.
 Radhika Bhangia as Inaaya
 Meherzan Mazda as Smaran
 Ayaz Khan as Shrikant Malhotra: Manik's father.
 Kishori Murthy as Amms: Nandini's grandmother.
 Aayush Shokeen is as grown-up Rishabh: student at SPACE Goa.
 Sagar Parekh as Yuvan: student at SPACE Goa.
 Manan Bhardwaj as Latika: student at SPACE Goa.
 Punit Tejwani as Dushyant: Nyonika's boyfriend and Advait's father.
 Ayush Tandon as Advait: student at SPACE Goa.
 Binita Budhathoki as Seher: Noor's biological mother and student at SPACE Goa.
 Janya Khandpur as Kashin: student at SPACE Goa and Omkar's sister.
 Palash Tiwari as Omkar: Nandini's boss and Kashin's brother.

Guest appearances
 Shaan
 Sunny Leone
 Emraan Hashmi and Amyra Dastur
 Badshah
 Gautam Gulati
 Pyaar Ka Punchnama 2 team
 Salman Khan and Sonam Kapoor for Prem Ratan Dhan Payo

Series overview

References

External links

 
 

Boys Over Flowers
2014 Indian television series debuts
Indian LGBT-related television shows
MTV (Indian TV channel) original programming
Indian drama television series
Indian teen drama television series
Hindi-language television shows
Television shows based on manga
Indian television series based on South Korean television series
2010s LGBT-related drama television series
2010s LGBT-related comedy television series